Adrienne is a feminine given name.

Adrienne may also refer to:

 French frigate Adrienne (1809)
 Adrienne (painting), a 1919 painting by Gustave Van de Woestijne
 "Adrienne" (song), by The Calling
 "Adrienne", a 1971 single by Tommy James